Fahad Ali (born 17 September 1993) is an Indian television actor best known for portraying Keshav Desai "KD" in The Buddy Project and Vivaan in Yeh Rishta Kya Kehlata Hai. In 2018, he participated in MTV Splitsvilla. Ali made his web series debut with ALT Balaji's NSA in 2019.

Early life 
Ali was born on 17 September 1992 in Dehradun, India.

Career 
Ali started his career in 2011 with the longest running show, Balika Vadhu. Later in the same year he played Tinnu in Chhoti Si Zindagi. In 2012, he acted in Zindagi Kahe - Smile Please opposite Additi Gupta. Ali made and episodic appearance in Ekta Kapoor's Gumrah: End of Innocence. 

Ali rose to success when he bagged Channel V India's The Buddy Project where he portrayed the lead role of Keshav until 2014. In 2013, he played Mayank in Pavitra Bandhan. In 2014, he made and episodic appearance in Yeh Hai Aashiqui opposite Annie Gill. In 2015, he also acted in Pyaar Tune Kya Kiya as Arjun. He later played the main lead in Sony TV's Muh Boli Shaadi as Nikhil. The show ended on 19 June 2015. After the end of Muh Boli Shaadi, Ali joined Life OK's Jaane Kya Hoga Rama Re playing the role of Sunny.

In 2016, he entered Star Plus's longest running show, Yeh Rishta Kya Kehlata Hai as Vivaan. In 2018, he participated in MTV Splitsvilla 11 as a celebrity contestant. He got eliminated in 6th place few weeks before the grand finale. In 2019, he appeared in &TV's Laal Ishq. He later appeared in Yeh Ishq Nahi Aasan along with Chetna Pande. 

In 2020, he made his Bollywood web debut with Karan Johar's Guilty. He later joined Sony TV's Ek Duje Ke Vaaste 2 as Vikram.

Television

 Web series 

Filmography

 References 

External links
 Fahad Ali on IMDb''
Fahad Ali on Instagram

Living people
Indian male television actors

1998 births
People from Dehradun